Peter Berndtson (1909–1972) was an American architect.

Born in Massachusetts, he studied at Massachusetts Institute of Technology for two years, but dropped out after his father died. In 1938, he began studies at Frank Lloyd Wright's (1867-1959) Taliesin Fellowship, where he worked on projects that included the Guggenheim Museum. Here, he also met and soon married another student, Cornelia Brierly, who had also studied at Carnegie Tech in Pittsburgh, Pennsylvania. The couple settled in Western Pennsylvania and together applied Wrightian theories to home design. In 1946, Peter became a registered Pennsylvania architect.

Berndtson's best known work is Polymath Park, located 60 miles southwest of Pittsburgh in the Laurel Highlands and sited near Wright's Fallingwater and Kentuck Knob. The park features two Berndtson houses as well as Wright's Duncan House. Though he designed more than 80 houses throughout his career, only 30 were constructed. Berndtson died December 27th, 1972.

Carnegie Mellon University's Hunt Library houses the Peter Berndtson Collection, which comprises documents on nearly 100 Berndtson architectural projects.

Further reading

References

External links
Polymath Park website
https://www.newspapers.com/image/448626060/?clipping_id=48392063&article=4e91938b-2f33-41c6-acce-ae9c8bc13f50&fcfToken=eyJhbGciOiJIUzI1NiIsInR5cCI6IkpXVCJ9.eyJmcmVlLXZpZXctaWQiOjQ0ODYyNjA2MCwiaWF0IjoxNjc2MTU4NDc1LCJleHAiOjE2NzYyNDQ4NzV9.UcmhgIbV8HjT9Tdr5eP8YlpS_cxTux2PcLHwCofzDsA

1909 births
1972 deaths
Architects from Pittsburgh
20th-century American architects